Illston on the Hill is a small village and parish seven miles north of Market Harborough in the county of Leicestershire. The population of the civil parish at the 2011 census (including Carlton Curlieu) was 179.   The old part of Illston is a rare "dead end" village: literally, at the end of the road which leads to it. Illston has a small but thriving pub, drawing trade from several miles around, serving Everard's beers. The pub's walls are crowded with an eclectic array of rural memorabilia including mounted fox heads, stuffed animals and historic gin traps, as well as a number of cartoons by local resident Ed McLachlan (Private Eye, Punch, etc.). Illston also has a village hall available for rent. In the summer it hosts events including a Village Fete and 'Onion Sunday'.

References

External links

  Fox and Goose
  Village Hall
 Village Hall website
 Parish Council website
 History
 Ordnance Survey Map of Village from multimap
 Photographs of village from Geograph

Villages in Leicestershire
Civil parishes in Harborough District